Kenny Smith is an American guitarist and vocalist in the bluegrass tradition.

Biography

Early years
Smith is originally from Nine Mile, Indiana. His father and grandfather played fiddle, and Smith started playing guitar at age 4. He learned to play fiddle tunes on the guitar by listening to Norman Blake's albums.

Lonesome River Band
Smith began playing professionally with Claire Lynch and the Front Porch Stringband in 1993. In 1996, Smith joined Sammy Shelor, Don Rigsby, and Ronnie Bowman as a member of The Lonesome River Band, replacing Tim Austin. While a part of this group, Smith won the International Bluegrass Music Association's (IBMA) Guitarist of the Year award in 1999 and 2000. He left the band in 2001.

Kenny and Amanda Smith
Kenny and Amanda Smith met at a Lonesome River Band concert, where Amanda gave Kenny a tape of her music. They decided to collaborate, and then decided to marry.

Their first album Slowly But Surely in 2001 was recorded when Kenny was still with the Lonesome River Band and Amanda was working a day job. The album was popular enough to be listed on the bluegrass charts, and the Smiths decided to form the Kenny and Amanda Smith Band. They won the IBMA's Emerging Artist of the Year award in 2003.

In 2004, they released the album House Down the Block. Ronald Inscore played mandolin, Steve Hubers played banjo, and Greg Martin played bass.

The Kenny and Amanda Smith Band released Live and Learn in 2008, along with Zachary McLamb (bass), Aaron Williams (mandolin), and Ron Stewart (fiddle, banjo).

On their album Unbound they were assisted by Wayne Winkle (vocals), Kyle Perkins (bass), Jacob Burleson (mandolin), and Justin Jenkins (banjo). The lead single "You Know That I Would" stayed at the No. 1 spot for consecutive weeks on the Bluegrass Today Weekly Airplay charts.

Solo recordings
Smith's debut solo album Studebaker was released in 1997, featuring Amanda Smith (vocals), Barry Bales (bass), Adam Steffey (mandolin), Sammy Shelor (banjo), Don Rigsby. Daniel Carwile (fiddle), and Ronnie Bowman.

On his 2011 album Return, Smith employed a variety of vintage guitars: his 1935 Martin D-18, Norman Blake’s sunburst 1933 D-28, and a Gibson 1935 jumbo prototype. Musicians on the album included Bales, Steffey, Aubrey Haynie (fiddle), Jim Denman (banjo), and Adam Hurt (clawhammer banjo). Glenn Tabor co-produced the album with Smith.

Band of Ruhks
Smith is a founding member of Band Of Ruhks, along with Don Rigsby and Ronnie Bowman. During a Lonesome River Band reunion performance, all three discovered a mutual longing to once again perform together. Band of Ruhks released a self-titled album in 2015. Brian Fesler plays banjo in the band.

Music instruction
Smith has taught at guitar workshops and master classes. In 2004, AcuTab Publications released Smith's Tunes and Techniques, a two-DVD instruction set. In 2017, Smith launched KennySmithGuitar.com, with instructional videos, product reviews, interviews with other musicians, and information about classic vintage guitars. Guitar lessons are priced based on length, but all other content is free to view.

Guitars
Luthier Randy Lucas designed the Kenny Smith model guitar using Smith's 1935 Martin D-18 as a conceptual starting point. Only twenty one were built.

Personal life
Smith lives in Lebanon, Tennessee with his wife Amanda and their daughter Annabelle.

Discography

Solo records
 1997: Studebaker (Sugar Hill)
 2011: Return (Gat3)

As Kenny and Amanda Smith
 2001: Slowly but Surely (Farm Boy)
 2004: House Down the Block (Rebel)
 2005: Always Never Enough (Rebel)
 2007: Tell Someone (Rebel)
 2008: Live and Learn (Rebel)
 2012: Catch Me If I Try (Farm Boy)
 2016: Unbound (Farm Boy)

With the Lonesome River Band
 1996: One Step Forward (Sugar Hill)
 1998: Finding the Way (Sugar Hill)
 2000: Talkin' to Myself (Sugar Hill)

Also appears on
 1995: Claire Lynch - Moonlighter (Rounder)
 1997: Sammy Shelor: Leading Roll (Sugar Hill)
 1998: Butch Baldassari - New Classics for Bluegrass Mandolin (Sound Art)
 1998: Ronnie Bowman - The Man I'm Tryin' to Be (Sugar Hill)
 1998: Don Rigsby - A Vision (Sugar Hill)
 1999: Ari Vaughan - I Just Want to Thank You Lord (Freeland)
 2000: Alan Bibey - In The Blue Room (Sugar Hill)
 2001: The Country Gentlemen - Crying in the Chapel (Freeland)
 2001: Candlewyck - Crooked Creek Road (Votive)
 2004: John Lawless - Five & Dime (Copper Creek)
 2004: Ralph Stanley II - Carrying On (Rebel)
 2005: Larry Sparks - 40 (Rebel)
 2012: Marty Raybon - Southern Roots & Branches (Yesterday & Today) (Rural Rhythm)
 2014: Steve Gulley - Family, Friends & Fellowship (Rural Rhythm)
 2014: Phil Leadbetter - The Next Move (Pinecastle)
 2016: Stuart Wyrick - East Tennessee Sunrise (Rural Rhythm)

Music instruction 
 2004: Tunes and Techniques DVD (Accutab)

References

External links 
 
 
 
 
 

1967 births
Living people
American country guitarists
American bluegrass musicians
American bluegrass guitarists
20th-century American singers
20th-century American musicians
21st-century American musicians
20th-century American guitarists
Country musicians from Indiana
Lonesome River Band members